Cynthia Immaculée Chéry (born 3 September 1994) is a Haitian footballer who plays as a goalkeeper. She has been a member of the Haiti women's national team.

References

1994 births
Living people
Women's association football goalkeepers
Haitian women's footballers
Haiti women's international footballers
Competitors at the 2014 Central American and Caribbean Games